The  is a railway line in Yamagata Prefecture, Japan, operated by the East Japan Railway Company (JR East). It connects Shinjō Station to Amarume Station, and trains continue on to Sakata Station, even though it is not officially a part of the Rikuu West Line.

Its name refers to the ancient provinces of Mutsu  and Dewa  (or alternatively, the Meiji-era provinces of Rikuzen  and Uzen ), although strictly speaking, only the Rikuu East Line connects both areas.

Station list
 All stations are located in Yamagata Prefecture.

Symbols:
 | - Single-track
 ◇ - Single-track; station where trains can pass
 ^ - Double-track section starts from this point
 ∥ - Double-track
 ∨ - Single-track section starts from this point

Rolling stock
 KiHa 110 series DMUs

History
The line was opened in sections between 1913 and 1914. Freight services ceased in 1987, and CTC signalling was commissioned in 1991.

Due to the construction of a tunnel, that is part of Shinjo Sakata Road of National Route 47, the Rikuu West Line has temporarily suspended services since 14 May 2022 until at least 2024~2025, with replacement buses operating in the neighbour towns of stations.

References

External links

 JR East website with stations listing 

 
Lines of East Japan Railway Company
Rail transport in Yamagata Prefecture
1067 mm gauge railways in Japan